Sunyani East is a parliamentary constituency in the Bono Region of Ghana. The current member of parliament (MP) for this constituency is Kwasi  Ameyaw-Cherimeh.

Current MP
Kwasi Ameyaw-Cherimeh is the current MP for the Sunyani East constituency. He was elected on the ticket of the New Patriotic Party (NPP) and won a majority of 14,935 votes to become the MP. He succeeded Joseph Henry Mensah, who had also represented the constituency in the 4th Republic parliament on the ticket of the NPP.

See also
List of Ghana Parliament constituencies

References 

Parliamentary constituencies in the Bono Region